Polincove is a commune in the Pas-de-Calais department in the Hauts-de-France region of France.

Geography
Polincove lies about 10 miles (16 km) southeast of Calais, at the junction of the D218 and D219 roads and by the banks of the river Hem.

Population

Places of interest
 The church of St.Leger, dating from the eighteenth century.

See also
Communes of the Pas-de-Calais department

References

External links

 Statistical data, INSEE

Communes of Pas-de-Calais